WAAI (100.9 FM) is a radio station broadcasting a classic country music format. Its tower is in Hurlock, Maryland, but broadcasts emanate from its studios in Cambridge, Maryland.  It is currently owned by the Draper Holdings Business Trust, as part of a cluster with CBS/Fox affiliate WBOC-TV (channel 16), NBC affiliate WRDE-LD (channel 31), Telemundo affiliate WBOC-LD (channel 42), and sister radio stations WCEM-FM, WBOC-FM, WCEM and WTDK.

References

External links

WAAI FM Facebook Page

AAI
Classic country radio stations in the United States
Radio stations established in 1990
1990 establishments in Maryland